Paul Bradshaw is a British  television writer, director and producer.

Biography
Bradshaw began his career at the BBC in 1994 as part of the production team on Tomorrow's World, his first films were for the 1998 series Meet the Ancestors, followed by The Making of the Royal Institution Christmas Lectures and Journeys to the Bottom of the Sea.

He co-wrote and co-directed the 2006 series Nuremberg: Nazis on Trial that re-enacted the Nuremberg Trials of prominent Nazi war criminals.

He produced the 2007 documentary film Climate Change: Britain Under Threat.

Filmography
 1998 Meet the Ancestors producer & assistant director
 2001 Blood of the Vikings series producer
 2002 What the Tudors Did for Us series producer
 2003 Timewatch producer & director
 2004 Terry Jones' Medieval Lives series producer
 2005 Egypt series producer
 2006 Nuremberg: Nazis on Trial director & writer
 2007 Climate Change: Britain Under Threat producer
 2009 The Incredible Human Journey series producer
 2011 The Animal's Guide to Britain series producer
 2012 Secrets Of Our Living Planet series producer
 2013 Ice Age Giants series producer
 2014 Wonders of the Monsoon series producer
 2016 Earth's Greatest Spectacles series producer

References

British writers
Living people
BBC people
Year of birth missing (living people)